Energy production in Greece is dominated by the formerly state owned Public Power Corporation (known mostly by its acronym ΔΕΗ, or in English DEI). In 2009 DEI supplied for 85.6% of all electric energy demand in Greece, while the number fell to 77.3% in 2010. Almost half (48%) of DEI's power output in 2010 was generated using lignite. 12% of Greece's electricity comes from hydroelectric power plants and another 20% from natural gas. Between 2009 and 2010, independent companies' energy production increased by 56%, from 2,709 Gigawatt hour in 2009 to 4,232 GWh in 2010.

In line with the European Commission's Directive on Renewable Energy, Greece aims to get 18% of its overall energy from renewable sources by 2020. In 2015, according to the independent power transmission operator in Greece (ΑΔΜΗΕ) more than 20% of the electricity in Greece was produced from renewable energy sources and hydroelectric powerplants. This percentage in April reached 50%. The same trend was the case also for 2016.

The contribution of non-hydroelectric renewable energy sources (RES) to the gross final electricity consumption accounted for 24.5% in 2016, while hydroelectric power represented approximately 25% by installed capacity. According to the Greek Electricity Market Operator (LAGIE), the total installed capacity in the Greek interconnected system at the end of 2016 accounted for almost 16,615 MW, including 3,912 MW lignite, 4,658 MW natural gas, 3,173 MW large hydro-power and 4,873 MW RES.

Greece currently does not have any nuclear power plants in operation, however in 2009 the Academy of Athens suggested that research in the possibility of Greek nuclear power plants begin.

Tables & market share of companies 

Since August 2021 the market share of each company offering electricity to households and businesses are as follows:

PPC/ΔΕΗ: 75.1% or 5.1 million subscribers

Protergia: 3.94% or 267 thousand subscribers

Elpedison: 3.67% or 249 thousand subscribers

ΗΡΩΝ/IRON: 3.32% or 225 thousand subscribers

Watt+Volt: 2.5% or 169 thousand subscribers

ZeniΘ: 2.48% or 168 thousand subscribers

NRG: 1.99% or 135 thousand subscribers

Volton: 1.75% or 118 thousand subscribers

Φυσικό αέριο Αττικής/Gas of Attica: 1.5% or 101 thousand subscribers

Volterra: 0,57% or 38 thousand subscribers

Fossil fuel

Oil and gas 

Greece has 10 million barrels of proved oil reserves as of 1 January 2011. Hellenic Petroleum is the country's largest oil company, followed by Motor Oil Hellas. Greece's oil production stands at 7,946 barrels per day (bbl/d), ranked 90th, while it exports 1,863 bbl/d (57th) and imports 496,600 bbl/d (25th).

In 2011 the Greek government approved the start of oil exploration and drilling in three locations within Greece, with an estimated output of 250 to 300 million barrels over the next 15 to 20 years. The estimated output in Euros of the three deposits is €25 billion over a 15-year period, of which €13–€14 billion will enter state coffers. Greece's dispute with Turkey over the Aegean poses substantial obstacles to oil exploration in the Aegean Sea.

In addition to the above, Greece is also to start oil and gas exploration in other locations in the Ionian Sea as well as the Libyan Sea, within the Greek exclusive economic zone, south of Crete. The Ministry of the Environment, Energy and Climate Change announced that there was interest from various countries (including Norway and the United States) in exploration, and the first results regarding the amount of oil and gas in these locations are expected in the summer of 2012.

A number of oil and gas pipelines are currently under construction or under planning in the country. Such projects include the Interconnector Turkey-Greece-Italy (ITGI) and South Stream gas pipelines.

Coal
Megalopoli Mine is a large lignite and coal mine owned by the Public Power Corporation of Greece. The largest lignite and coal mine in Greece are in the area of Western Macedonia and especially in Ptolemaida. Greece plans to shut down the last coal fired power plant in the country by 2025.

Renewable energy

Biomass

Regulation Background 
EU Renewable Energy Directive 2009/28/EC requires the EU to fulfill at least 20% of its total energy needs with renewable by 2020. This should be achieved through the attainment of individual national targets. EU Commission allocates biomass as the third source of energy within EU after wind.  Greek State allocated  350 MW of electricity to biomass - bio-fuels

Greek Situation Analysis 
 Currently <50 MW of biomass - bio-fuels to energy are operating in Greece (Out of 350 MW).
 Feed in tariff (FIT) is 198 €/MW h.
 20-year contract with an extension option at the end.
 There is a quite long licensing process.

Wind

Solar

See also 

 Energy policy of the European Union

References